, (born Hiroshima, 25 June 1963) is a Japanese former rugby union footballer who played as a prop. He is not related to fellow Japanese international Kenichi Kimura.

Career
After graduating from Doshisha University, Kimura played for World in the All-Japan Rugby Company Championhship. He was first capped for the Japan national team against France XV at Osaka on 30 September 1984. He was also present in the 1987 Rugby World Cup squad, where he played two matches. His last cap was against New Zealand XV in Tokyo on 1 November 1987, earning 10 international caps for Japan.

Notes

External links
代表キャップ保持者一覧
Toshitaka Kimura international stats

1963 births
Living people
Rugby union props
Sportspeople from Tokyo
Japanese rugby union players
Japan international rugby union players